Barták (feminine Bartáková) is a Czech surname. Notable people include:

 Jan Barták, Czech figure skater
 Lambert Bartak, American organist
 Lenka Bartáková, Czech basketball player
 Marie Bartáková, Czech rower
 Martin Barták, Czech politician

Czech-language surnames